Paremonia is a genus of moths in the subfamily Arctiinae.

Species
 Paremonia argentata Hampson, 1914
 Paremonia luteicincta Holland, 1893

References

Natural History Museum Lepidoptera generic names catalog

Lithosiini
Moth genera